Marcos Vinícius Costa Guedes (born 16 December 1992), better known as Marcos Thank,  is a Brazilian footballer who was signed for I-league club Chennai City FC.

Club career

Chennai City
In December 2016, Thank was signed by new I-League entrant, Chennai City F.C. He made his debut against Minerva Punjab, when he was substituted on 82nd minute. He scored his first goal for the club on 21|1|17 in a home game against Mohun Bagan and also became the club's first ever goalscorer.

Career statistics

References

1992 births
Living people
I-League players
Chennai City FC players
Expatriate footballers in India
Brazilian footballers
Association football forwards